Bondroitia is a small genus of ants in the subfamily Myrmicinae. Its two species are from Africa.

Species
 Bondroitia lujae (Forel, 1909)
 Bondroitia saharensis (Santschi, 1923)

References

External links

Myrmicinae
Ant genera
Hymenoptera of Africa